Jovan Markovski (born March 28, 1988) is a Macedonian professional basketball small forward who last played for TFT. He is older brother of Gorjan Markovski who is also basketball player and plays for Kumanovo

External links

References

1988 births
Living people
Macedonian men's basketball players
Sportspeople from Skopje
Small forwards